Connemara Community Radio is a community-based radio station broadcasting for 10 hours per day throughout the north-west Connemara region of Ireland. It initially began broadcasting in September 1988 until New Year's Eve 1988 as a pirate station. In 1995 Community Radio licences were issued and the station began broadcasting on 1 July 1995.  The Station broadcasts six hours of live radio between 11.00 AM - 12.00 PM and 4.00 PM - 9.00 PM and 4 hours of the previous evenings program from 12.00 AM - 4.00 PM.

It's the smallest radio station operating in Ireland with a possible audience within a franchise area of 13,000 people. The management and operation of the station is undertaken on a voluntary basis assisted by a small core staff.

Involved with the station are a core of 90 volunteers who contribute each week to the station as presenters, technicians, correspondents etc.  It also has a Walkers Group who have a fund-raising walk each year. 
The Station broadcasts on 87.8 and 106.1 MHz from two 300 watt transmitters, due to the mountainous terrain of the Connemara area.

See also

 CRAOL
 Connemara
 County Galway
 Letterfrack

External links 
 

Community radio stations in Ireland
Mass media in County Galway

Radio stations established in 1995